The CNNA HL-1 was a light utility aircraft developed in Brazil in 1940. It was a high-wing strut-braced monoplane with fixed tailskid undercarriage and seating for two persons in tandem.

Development
The design was developed by Henrique Lage as a two-seat cabin monoplane, bearing a strong resemblance to the contemporary Piper Cub. It was produced by the Cia Nacionale de Navegaçao Aéreo (CNNA) as the HL-1. Most of the aircraft were purchased by Brazilian aeroclubs, funded by the government's National Aviation Campaign (Campanha Nacional de Aviação) to train pilots for military service. Production continued until 1950 and a small number were exported to neighbouring countries.

Variants
HL-1A
Eight were been built.
HL-1B
Main production version with smaller fuel tank than original design.
HL-1C
One prototype constructed
HL-5
Floatplane version.  One prototype constructed.

Specifications

References

Further reading

External links
 São Paulo Technical Museum website

HL-1
1940s Brazilian civil utility aircraft
High-wing aircraft
Single-engined tractor aircraft
Aircraft first flown in 1940